Taylor Knibb (born February 14, 1998) is an American triathlete who is the 2022 Women's Ironman 70.3 World Champion. She competed in the women's event at the 2020 Summer Olympics, held in Tokyo in 2021, finishing sixteenth. Later that same Olympics, she won a silver medal in the mixed relay event. Knibb is the youngest woman ever to qualify for the US Olympic triathlon team. Knibb earned her spot on the Olympic team after she won gold in the season opener of the 2021 World Triathlon Championship Series, held on May 15, 2021, in Yokohoma, Japan.

In October 2022 Knibb won the Women's Ironman 70.3 World Championship, held in St George, Utah.

Knibb began participating in triathlons as a young girl, inspired by watching her mother, Leslie Knibb, compete in the Ironman triathlon. She joined the national team in 2017, and remains the youngest athlete on the team.

References

External links
 

1998 births
Living people
American female triathletes
Olympic triathletes of the United States
Triathletes at the 2020 Summer Olympics
Place of birth missing (living people)
Medalists at the 2020 Summer Olympics
Olympic silver medalists for the United States in triathlon
21st-century American women